The 1974 Tournament Players Championship was a golf tournament in Georgia on the PGA Tour, held August 29 to September 2 at Atlanta Country Club in Marietta, a suburb northwest of Atlanta. This was the first Tournament Players Championship, and Jack Nicklaus won the first of his three TPC titles, two strokes ahead of runner-up J. C. Snead, the 54-hole leader.

The final round on Sunday was interrupted several times by weather and twelve players completed their rounds on Monday morning, Labor Day.

The year's concluding major, the PGA Championship, was played three weeks earlier in North Carolina and won by Lee Trevino, a stroke ahead of Nicklaus. Trevino opened with 69 at the TPC but finished twelve shots back, in eighteenth place.

Venue

This was the only Tournament Players Championship held in Georgia; it went to Texas in 1975 and relocated to Florida in 1976. Except for this year, the Atlanta Country Club hosted the Atlanta Classic on the PGA Tour from 1967 through 1996.

Round summaries

First round
Thursday, August 29, 1974
Friday, August 30, 1974

Source:

Second round
Friday, August 30, 1974

Source:

Third round
Saturday, August 31, 1974

Source:

Final round
Sunday, September 1, 1974
Monday, September 2, 1974

Source:

References

External links
The Players Championship website

1974
1974 in golf
1974 in American sports
1974 in sports in Georgia (U.S. state)
August 1974 sports events in the United States
September 1974 sports events in the United States